The invasion and occupation of Monaco refers to the presence of Italian and German forces between 1940 and 1944 on the territory of the Principality of Monaco (French: Principauté de Monaco; Ligurian: Prinçipatu de Múnegu) and the control they exerted within the territory.

In late 1942 Italian army invaded the Principality for strategic purposes in part because anti-fascist forces were gaining ground in Northern Africa. A little less than a year after German forces occupied the territories of Monaco. Albeit Hitler's interest in Monaco's neutrality, which greatly benefited Nazi's economic strategies, the German army intervened in Monaco's peaceful living and deported several Jewish people to concentration camps.

Pre-war context 
After the end of the World War I, the Principality of Monaco was under French military protection in accordance with the  Franco-Monégasque Treaty signed in July 1918.

In the 1930s, Monaco was already known for its lavishness with the Monte Carlo Casino and automobile racing attracting visitors from around the world. Monaco enjoyed relative prosperity in the pre-war period even though there was some instability due to the rule of Prince Louis II.

Pre-World War II Monaco 

Monaco was a neutral state during World War II, but its function and position were fiercely disputed by Germany and Italy, who had conflicting opinions and ideas about its future. Germany coveted Monaco's neutrality because its flexible company regulations and lucrative tax system allowed Nazis to trade with the rest of the world through its figurehead enterprises in the Principality. With access to a neutral country, Germany could obtain foreign currency, which was a necessary component for carrying out ambitious military projects and war-related duties.

World War II
800 inhabitants were mobilized when the war started in 1939, along with 300 French soldiers. In June 1940, Italy declared war against France. This served as a warning to Monegasque leaders who closed the casino and arrested a hundred Mussolini supporters.

In the late 1940s and 1941s, tensions between Fascist Italians and the French population in Monaco rose, the principality becoming a stage of these tensions due its geography and demographics. A demonstration of this was for example the spread of a version of the Marseillaise mocking Italians called ‘lets go children of Italy’ (‘Allez, Enfants de l’Italie’). Violent interactions also occurred, with the death of Pierre Weck in October 1940 particularly causing anger among the French community. Pierre Weck was a young Frenchman who was that night walking with his friends when he crossed paths with two Italians singing ‘viva Mussolini, vive le Duce’. When Weck asked them to stop, the Italians violently responded, leading to the death of Weck two days later. The report by the surgeon indicated a cause of death from hitting the pavement, thus leaving the two Italians free of charges, despite protests by the French population.

Although Monaco accepted that French defense installations be established along the coast in the pre-war period, Louis had always declared his intention for Monaco to remain neutral if a war was to emerge. While neutrality was indeed officially promoted up to November 1942, Monaco became involved in a number of financial agreements with Germany which meant that the Nazis accepted Monaco's claims of independence. The Germans notably wanted to control the Société des Bains de Mers et des étrangers (SBM) which was particularly powerful in Monaco as the owner of the casino. Such German presence in the principality's industries then extended to other domains, notably for the production of German propaganda and the purchase of armaments by the Germans on the open market.

Food supplies were particularly abundant in the Principality compared to the rest of occupied Europe, notably for those involved in war profiting who came to Monaco to avoid taxes. Monte Carlo was particularly known for maintaining its entertainment scene during the war. However, wealth and abundance of supplies did not apply to the whole population as rationing and an increase of prices took place in other regions.

Monaco's geographic location was crucial to Italy's strategic goals. Mussolini deployed his forces to take Monaco in June 1940, shortly after fascist Italy declared war on France, in order to control the port of Monte Carlo and gain a territorial advantage. By early 1942, Monaco's port was under the Italian Armistice Commission's control. Monaco thus attempted to make a deal with Switzerland to escape Italy's control, but discussions were unsuccessful.

Italian invasion and occupation (November 11, 1942 - September 9, 1943)

The neutral status of Monaco meant that Italy could not invade the Principality unless attacked by Monaco. The Italians thus made the claim that the French defence installations on the coast were proof of Monaco's non-neutrality, and invaded the principality on November 11. However, scholars point to the creation of a US consulate in Monaco on November 5 as an explanation for the timing of the invasion. The new consul Walter Oberaugh was indeed in contact with the French Resistance when he was consul in Nice, and Mussolini's regime saw these new US-Monegasque diplomatic relations as a threat to its influence in Monaco. The US consulate was the first target of the Italian forces on November 16, after access to sea or land had been shut. In the days of the invasion, Prince Louis sent letters to Pope Pius XII and to Hitler to point to the breach of Monaco's sovereignty. After this event, imprisoned irredentists were freed by Italian forces  and arrests and interments of anti-fascists began, with male British being the priority targets, although most had already left at the start of the war.

A puppet-state was established. However, the wealthy population in Monte Carlo maintained their luxurious lifestyle, with the casino staying open. As Allies gained ground in Northern Africa and Italy, 
foreigners and black market activities became the new targets of Italian repression.

The German occupation (September 9, 1943 - September 3, 1944) 
After Mussolini was arrested in July 1943, Italian forces and radical Fascists left Monaco. The Monegasques participated in riots against shops and houses in the Italian quarter. Soon after, German vehicles began entering the Principality. The Nazis took control of Monaco and established the Nazi High Command's headquarters at the Hotel de Paris. Prince Louis, wary of maintaining his status, welcomed the Germans, using his German roots as a linking factor. This led to a special treatment of Monaco by Germany and enabled Germany to put in place many of the projects developed earlier in the war to use Monaco's alleged neutrality for financial purposes. They created more than three hundred holding companies and engaged in money laundering. A bank was established in summer 1944 by the Germans who sought to bypass the American economic embargo. Fraudulent businesses became abundant in the Principality.

During this period, Monegasque authorities worked with the Gestapo to eliminate resistants and a number of anti-fascists.  Minister of state Roblot argued that Germany had threatened to stop Monaco's special treatment if it ceased cooperation.

After the bombing of the Antheor rail viaduct by Allied forces, food supplies by train were stopped until the end of the war, leading to malnutrition. Water and bread supplies were interrupted  by later bombings.

Bombing continued until September 2–3, when the Germans left Monaco. American Jeeps then started to arrive.

Throughout the World War II period, Prince Louis kept Emile Roblot as his minister of state despite his affiliations with pro-fascist individuals, and despite demands by the Monesgasque and French populations to dismiss him. Roblot played an important role in the positions taken by Monaco as a consequence of Italian and German occupations. After the Germans left Monaco, Roblot forbid pro-Allied demonstrations. At his return to Monaco, Ranier III, alarmed by the actions undertaken during and after the occupation, went to see his grandfather to ask for Roblot's dismission. Prince Louis refused but Roblot decided to leave in 1945 after popular demonstrations.

As decided by Monegasque leaders, no war trials were conducted in the municipality in the aftermath of World War II.

Deportation of Jews

When they arrived in Monaco, Mussolini's forces created a Fascist political bureau. Its aim was to identify and arrest Monegasques and French residents involved with the Resistance. Despite this, the Resistance still operated throughout the period, hiding Jewish people and sending them to Switzerland. While Prince Louis made Mussolini promise that the Jewish population would not be deported in Monaco, the Monegasque did not intervene when his peer, Raoul Gunsbourg was made to resign and was to be arrested before he escaped.

Although neither Mussolini nor Hitler attempted to establish a fascist regime in Monaco, under the pressure of the latter there are also several cases of deportation of people to concentration camps. During the occupation, the Jewish population of Monaco, estimated by consul Hellenthal to be between 1000 and 1500 inhabitants, was targeted by the German authorities who arrested them and sent them to occupied territories in France for internment. According to a government assessment, roughly 90 persons were deported from Monaco during the night of August 1, 1942, with only nine surviving. Among the deportees was René Blum, the founder of the opera house, who died in Auschwitz. Seventy-three years later, Prince Albert II of Monaco publicly apologized for the Holocaust deportation of 90 Jews and acknowledged Louis II's failure to maintain Monaco's neutrality during WWII.

See also 
 World War II
 Nazi Germany
 Italy during World War II

References

Further reading 

 Abramovici P. (2001) Un rocher bien occupé : Monaco pendant la guerre 1939–1945 Editions Seuil, Paris, .
 Edwards, A. (1992). "The Grimaldis of Monaco: centuries of scandal, years of grace" Lyons Press. 
 Kundahl, G. (2017). The Riviera at War: World War II on the Côte d'Azur. I.B. Tauris & Co. Ltd., Chapter 15: Monaco, .
 Sica, E. (2016). Mussolini's army in the French Riviera : Italy's occupation of France" University of Illinois Press, Urbana. 
 Torel, D. (1984). Réflexions sur le traitement particulier de la "question juive" en Principauté de Monaco durant la Seconde Guerre mondiale. Le Monde Juif, 116, 175–192.

History of Monaco
World War II